The Sergipe-Alagoas Basin is a continental margin basin in the Sergipe and Alagoas states of northeastern Brazil, about 20 to 50 kilometres wide onshore, but with its widest extension offshore, more precisely 13,000 km2 onshore and 40,000 km2 offshore. In general, "Sergipe-Alagoas Basin" refers to the Sergipe and Alagoas sub-basins, but it also consists of the Jacuípe and Cabo sub-basins. Studies of the basin's geology date back to the first half of the 19th century, when J. Henderson in 1821 published preliminary notes on the region's geology.

The basin formed during the opening of the South Atlantic Ocean in the Late Jurassic and Cretaceous periods alongside other basins in the Brazilian coast.

History 

Studies of the basin's geology date back to the first half of the 19th century, when J. Henderson in 1821 published preliminary notes on the region's geology, but the first geological and paleontological surveys were carried out in 1865–1866 by the Canadian naturalist Charles Frederick Hartt, a participant of the Thayer Expedition. The results of this expedition were published in the book “Geology and Physical Geography of Brazil” from 1870, where it was described fossils of ammonites and a gastropod from the municipalities of Maruim and Larangeiras. With the Commissão Geológica do Império do Brazil, an expedition from 1875 and 1878 directed by Hartt, important studies were carried by the American palaeontologist Charles A. White, describing ammonites, bivalves, gastropods and echinoids. John Casper Branner published in 1890 a report on the Sergipe-Alagoas Basin about the localities of White's materials.

Ralph Sopper published in 1914 the first geological map of the basin, but a more detailed map was published in 1924 by the “Serviço Geológico e Mineralógico do Brasil”.

Research of the Basin received strong motivation when search for petroleum begun in the 1940s, resulting in detailed maps and new fossil collections. Since 1953, the Brazilian Petroleum Company, PETROBRAS, produced various reports with the aim of improving knowledge of the region during the search for petroleum. Biostratigraphic studies by Karl Beurlen established a zonation of the Aptian-Albian Riachuelo Formation based on ammonites. He also published a number of subsequent studies from 1961 to 1968.

Geological History 
The geological evolution of the basin represents 5 tectonic stages: syneclise, pre-rift, rift, transitional and drift.

1) Syneclise stage  - Late Carboniferous to Early Permian - It is represented by the Batinga Formation, which probably was of glacial origin, which comprises siliciclastic rocks, and the Aracaré Formation, comprising eolian sandstones, shales and lacustrine algal laminites.

2) Pre-rift  stage - Late Jurassic - Represented by the Candeeiro Formation, Bananeiras Formation and Serraria Formation, when crustal uplift resulted in a series of depressions which were filled by fluvial and lacustrine sediments.

3) Rift stage - Early Cretaceous - Represented by the Rio Pitanga Formation, Penedo Formation, Barra de Itiúba Formation and Coqueiro Seco Formation, increasing tectonism led to the formation of a rift-valley, the newly created rift was filled by an alluvial-fluvial-deltaic system.

4) Transitional stage - Early Aptian - Represented by the Muribeca Formation and Maceió Formation, the transitional stage began when the first marine sediments were deposited.

5) Drift stage - Early to mid Albian - Represented by the Riachuelo Formation, begun in the Albian, even though marine regime was established already in the late Aptian. Events during the Cenomanian and early Turonian cause the drowning of the Riachuelo platform system.

Formations

The Basement 
Proterozoic (possibly Cambrian) in origin. Sub-basin Sergipe is composed of metamorphic rocks. Metasediments also occur, possibly of Cambrian origin. Sub-basin Alagoas is composed by granitic rocks from the Pernambuco-Alagoas Massif.

Estância Formation 
Cambrian in origin. Composed by red sandstones and siltstones with mica schists and conglomerate lenses. The depositional environment is thought to had been braided and meandering fluvial system.

The formation was named after the town of Estância in southern Sergipe.

Batinga Formation 
Late Carboniferous to Early Permian in origin. The siliciclastic rocks which compose the formation where formed under a glacio-marine environment.

It is divided into 3 member: The Mulungu, Atalaia and Boaciaca members. The Mulungu Member is represented by conglomerates and diamictites, the Atalaia Member consists of immature coarse-grained sandstones and the Boacica Member is composed by laminated siltstones, sandstones and conglomerates deposited by deltaic fans.

The formation was named after he village of Batinga in the northwestern part of the Sergipe Sub-basin.

Aracaré Formation 
Permian in origin. Composed by mature coarse-grained sandstones with large cross-stratification sets, associated with silicified oolitic-oncolitic calcarenites, algal mats and stromatolites. The original surroundings where suggested to have been a warm and dry desertic environment and shore bordering a large lake.

The name Aracaré originates from the Aracaré Hill, 2 km south of the town of Neópolis.

Candeeiro Formation 
Late Jurassic in origion. Composed of fine to medium-grained sandstones, possibly formed in a braided fluvial system. The formation is not exposed and no fossils have been found.

It was named after the Candeeiro-01 well (1-CO-1-AL) in Alagoas.

Bananeiras Formation 
Late Jurassic in origin. Composed by red shales deposited in a lacustrine environment. Fossils of non-marine ostracods, such as Bisulcocypris pricei and Darwinula aff. oblonga.

The formation was named after the village of Bananeiras in Sergipe.

Serraria Formation 
Late Jurassic to Early Cretaceous in origin. Composed by medium to coarse-grained sandstones with tabular and channelled cross-stratification. The sediments were deposited by a braided fluvial system, locally with eolian reworking. Large conifer trunks of the species Agathoxylon benderi where found in the formation's sandstones.

It was named after the small village of Serraria in southern Alagoas.

Barra de Itiúba Formation 
Early Cretaceous in origin. It is composed by succession of shales and fine-grained sandstones that interfingers laterally with the Penedo Formation. The formation was probably deposited by a deltaic system in a lacustrine environment. Much of the fossils there are of ostracods, like Cypridea and Paracypridea.

The formation was named after the Barra de Itiúba village in Alagoas.

Penedo Formation 
Early Cretaceous. Composed of coarse to medium-grained sandstones deposited in a fluvial-deltaic environment subject to eolian reworking. The only fossils found in the formation are of ostracods.

Its name derives from the town of Penedo on the Rio São Francisco in Alagoas.

Rio Pitanga Formation 
Hauterivian to early Aptian in origin. Composed of coarse-grained polymictic and aluvial conglomerates. No fossils have been found.

The name derives from the Rio Pitanga-01 well (1-RP-1-SE) in Sergipe.

Coqueiro Seco Formation 
Lower Cretaceous in origin. Consists of fine to coarse- grained sandstones and mudstones deposited in a fluvio- deltaic-lacustrine environment. Fossils are poorly preserved but abundant, specially in the Morro do Chaves Member.

The name derives from the Coqueiro Seco-01 well in Alagoas. It replaces the older name, Jiquiá Formation.

Ponta Verde Formation 
Early Aptian in origin. It's composed by characteristic grey to green shales formed during a widespread transgression in the area. Fossils are not common in the formation, however a abundance of the pollen Afropollis sp. is a characteristic feature of Ponta Verde. 

It is named after the Ponta Verde-01 well near Maceió.

Muribeca Formation 
Late Aptian in origin. The Formation is formed by 3 members, the Carmópolis, Ibura and Oiterinhos members. The Carmópolis Member is formed by sandstones with minor intercalations of siltstones and shales and polymictic conglomerates. The Ibura Member contains a succession of halite, sylvinite and carnallite. The Oiteirinhos Member has an alternation of laminated calcilutites and shales. Fossils found in the formation include foraminifers, palynomorphs, ostracods, conchostraceans and fish remains. 

The name Muribeca derives from the town of Muribeca in northern Sergipe, where was found rocks thought to be from this formation. In reality, the rocks are now assigned to the Rio Pitanga Formation, and the Muribeca Formation is not exposed at all.

Maceió Formation 
Late Aptian in origin, contemporary with Muribeca. Composed of coarse to fine-grained sandstones, with minor shale intercalations, and conglomerates. Common fossils in this in the shales are of conchostraceans and fish. 

It's named after the capital of Alagoas, Maceió.

Poção Formation 
Early Aptian to Late Aptian in origin. Composed of conglomerates and coarse-grained arkoses.

Riachuelo Formation 
Late Aptian to Early Cenomanian in origin. The formation is formed by 3 members, the Angico, Maruim and Taquari. The Angico member is composed by siliciclastic conglomerates and sandstones and the Taquari Member is composed of a cyclic alternation of marls and shales. Fossils of ammonites are bountiful in this formation, along side fossils of other molluscs and fish. 

The Formation was named after the municipality of Riachuelo.

Cotinguiba Formation 
Early Cenomanian to Middle Coniacian in origin. The formation consists of the Sapucari and Aracaju members, the Sapucari Member is formed of calcilutites and subordinately carbonate breccias that grade basinward onto the shales of the Aracaju Member. Although they are not as abundant as the Riachuelo Formation, the fossils of this formation are diverse, including ammonites and inoceramids. 

It was named after a vast valley the cuts the formation.

Calumbi Formation 
Santonian to Recent in origin. Formed by siltstones and olive-green shales and pale-yellow sandstones. The formation is generally poor on fossil remains, although some outcrops are abundant. 

The name derives from the small village of Calumbi west of Aracaju.

Marituba Formation 
Tertiary to Recent in origin. Composed mostly of medium to coarse sandstones, close to the coast. No fossils have been found in this formation yet. 

The name derives from the village of Marituba in Alagoas.

Mosqueiro Formation 
Composed mostly of bioclastic calcarenites. Most common fossils are fragments of molluscs and foraminifers. 

The name comes from the village of Mosqueiro in Sergipe.

Barreiras Group 
The Sergipe-Alagoas Basin is covered by wide areas of rock coming from this unit. It is composed immature and poorly sorted conglomerates and sandstones. 

It is named after the character of these sediments in parts of the coast where they form coastal cliffs, "barreiras" in Portuguese.

Stratigraphy

References 

Basins of South America